Sir Stephen Alan Moss (born 1947) is a British nurse.

He was knighted in the 2006 New Year Honours at the end of a long career in nursing, when he retired from his role of Chief Executive of the Queen's Medical Centre in Nottingham.
Born in Cannock, Staffordshire in 1947 . Resident of Chadsmoor .  see chadsmoor for further info

References

British nurses
1947 births
Knights Bachelor
Living people
Place of birth missing (living people)
Date of birth missing (living people)